Souleymane Bamba (born 13 January 1985) is a former professional footballer who played as a centre-back for the Ivory Coast National Team.

Bamba started his career in his native France with Paris Saint-Germain, but failed to establish himself in their first team. He moved to Scotland to join Dunfermline Athletic in 2006, helping the club reach the final of the Scottish Cup in his first season. Two years later, he was transferred to Hibernian, before joining English side Leicester City in January 2011.

He was sold to Turkish club Trabzonspor in 2012 for £750,000 before joining Palermo. However, he was loaned to Leeds United after making only one appearance in six months. He eventually joined Leeds on a permanent deal and was appointed club captain, spending a further year with the club before being released and subsequently joining Cardiff City. In his first full season with Cardiff, he helped the side win promotion to the Premier League.

Born in France to Ivorian parents, Bamba represented Ivory Coast in the 2008 Olympic Games and became a regular for the senior national side until his most recent cap in 2014. In 2012, he was part of the side that reached the final of the Africa Cup of Nations.

Club career

Paris Saint-Germain

Bamba began his career with Ligue 1 club Paris Saint-Germain (PSG) at the age of 11. He had been spotted by club scouts playing street football in Paris but had initially turned the club down as his mother hoped for him to become a doctor. He lived with his parents Sehrata and Bakary Bamba in Ivry-sur-Seine, a suburb in central Paris. Since his family could not afford the travel to the club's training facilities outside the city, he moved away from his family home to instead live at the club's academy. Originally playing as a defensive midfielder, he converted to playing as a central defender at the age of 15 after impressing there as cover for a teammate who had missed a match due to being stuck in traffic.

Despite impressing for PSG's youth and B teams, he only appeared in two first team games, in his final year at the club at the age of 21. Dissatisfied with his lack of appearances, Bamba asked to be sent out on loan to gain experience but was denied by manager, Vahid Halilhodžić, causing Bamba to reject PSG's offer of a new contract and subsequently leave the club. He later claimed that PSG had damaged potential transfers to other French sides after he left the club, stating "I was disappointed because my club said, 'He's a good player but he's a tough guy – he doesn't listen and he can get the team into trouble."

Dunfermline Athletic
After an initial trial period, Bamba signed for Scottish Premier League side Dunfermline Athletic in July 2006 on a two-year contract. Jim Leishman later revealed that he had been intending to bring over another player from France on trial, but this deal fell through and Bamba's agent sent him instead. Leishman was immediately impressed by Bamba's physique and his performance as a trialist during a preseason friendly against West Bromwich Albion striker John Hartson. He made his competitive debut for the club in Dunfermline's opening league match of the season, a 2–1 defeat to Hearts. On 2 December 2006, Bamba was sent off for the first time in his professional career after pushing Steven Naismith in the chest during a 5–1 defeat to Kilmarnock.

In his first season at the club, Bamba was part of the squad that reached the 2007 Scottish Cup Final and played in a 1–0 defeat to Celtic in the final. However, the club also suffered relegation from the Scottish Premier League after a seven-year spell in the division. Bamba signed a two-year contract extension at the start of the 2007–08 season. The extension brought an end to rumours of his desire to leave the club in order to play at a higher level and further his chances of breaking into the Ivory Coast national side, having not played in any of Dunfermline's preseason matches.

Bamba was allowed to go on trial with Championship side Watford in July 2008, appearing in a friendly for them against Boreham Wood. Soon afterwards, manager Jim McIntyre said he expected a fee to be agreed between Dunfermline and Watford, which would allow Bamba to move to the Championship side. The deal was thought to be almost complete, with Watford sending a doctor to China, where Bamba had travelled with the Ivory Coast Olympic squad, to conduct his medical. However, Watford later pulled out for unknown reasons. A few weeks later, Dunfermline accepted offers of £50,000 for Bamba to move to either Hibernian and Motherwell, keeping him in the Scottish Premier League.

Hibernian
Bamba chose to move to Hibernian, signing a three-year contract with the club. As part of the transfer deal, Dunfermline were due 10% of any future transfer fee. He was sent off on his debut for a second bookable offence against Dundee United, but Bamba subsequently established himself in the Hibs first team. Despite being a natural centre back, manager Mixu Paatelainen praised Bamba's performance as a defensive midfielder during a 2–0 win over Celtic in December 2008. Paatelainen commented further that he believed Bamba had improved as a player since his spell at Dunfermline, with him no longer going to ground when making a challenge, and described him as possessing "tremendous pace and physical presence." Bamba quickly became a popular player with the Hibs support due to his tough and committed tackling in this new role.

Following Paatelainen's departure, new manager John Hughes moved Bamba back to a central defensive role after the departure of Rob Jones in the 2009 season. In his second match in this position, Bamba scored his first ever professional goal in a 3–1 win against Falkirk on 22 August, heading in from a John Rankin corner. Coincidentally, he scored his second goal for the club at the same ground against the same team and in another 3–1 win, on 27 March. The Edinburgh Evening News reported on 8 May 2010 that Bamba's performances had "not gone unnoticed", with scouts from Fulham and Rennes due to watch Bamba. Sven-Göran Eriksson, the new manager of the Ivorian national team, was also due to watch Bamba ahead of the 2010 World Cup, but was not spotted at the last game played by Hibs in the 2009–10 season.

Bamba angered manager John Hughes when he failed to report for a pre-season tour of the Netherlands in July 2010. Bamba responded angrily to the criticism by claiming that he needed a full three weeks off after returning from the World Cup and had attempted to contact both Hughes and Hibernian's chairman to discuss the situation, but Hughes dropped Bamba from the first team squad when he eventually returned to Edinburgh. Bamba was made to train with the club's youth team on his return but was recalled for the second leg of a UEFA Europa League tie with NK Maribor at Easter Road, which Hibs lost 3–2 on the night and 6–2 on aggregate. Following the incident, manager Hughes stated his desire for the situation to be forgotten. During his time with Hibs, he made 80 appearances in all competitions, scoring four times.

Leicester City

With Bamba's contract with Hibs due to expire at the end of the 2010–11 season, the club agreed on a deal with Football League Championship club Leicester City for his transfer. The deal was confirmed on 2 January 2011, with Bamba joining for an undisclosed fee midway through the season, although sources placed the figure around £250,000 with Hibs also due to receive a percentage of any future transfer fee. He was reunited at Leicester with his former Ivory Coast manager, Sven-Göran Eriksson. He made his debut for the club in a 2–2 draw against Manchester City on 9 January in the third round of the FA Cup, scoring with his first touch of the ball. He scored his first two league goals in a 4–2 win over Millwall on 22 January.

After speculation linking him with several Premier League sides, including Blackburn Rovers, and French side Marseille during the 2011 summer transfer window, Bamba signed a new contract with Leicester in September 2011. During negotiations, Eriksson compared Bamba's style of play to that of former German international player Franz Beckenbauer. Blackburn manager Steve Kean had claimed that the two clubs had made a bid for Bamba and described the move as being "quite close" to being completed.

After Eriksson was replaced by Nigel Pearson as Leicester manager, Bamba played less regularly, particularly after January when the club signed Wes Morgan and Bamba missed a month to play in the African Cup of Nations with Ivory Coast. In his 17 months at the club, in total he played 55 games for the club in all competitions, scoring four goals. He later expressed his regret at leaving the club, stating his belief in Pearson's ability to help them win promotion to the Premier League.

Trabzonspor

Bamba signed for Turkish club Trabzonspor in June 2012 for a fee of £750,000 after being recommended to the club by his international teammate Didier Zokora. He made his debut for the club on 26 August 2012 playing the full 90 minutes, in a 2–0 victory at home to Elazigspor. He only made 18 appearances during his first season at the club, missing a proportion of fixtures in December and January in part because he was away with Ivory Coast as they qualified for the 2013 African Cup of Nations.

During the 2013–14 season, Bamba made 15 appearances for Trabzonspor in the first half of the season, including being a regular starter in their Europa League campaign. However, on 22 January 2014, he picked up an ankle injury which ruled him out for the majority of the latter part of the season. Bamba was not selected to play for Tranzonspor again after suffering the injury, however he recovered in time to play for Ivory Coast at the 2014 FIFA World Cup.

Palermo
On 26 August 2014, after having been released by Trabzonspor, Bamba agreed a three-year deal with newly promoted Serie A club Palermo. He made his Palermo debut on 24 September 2014, when he started the match for Palermo in a 3–3 draw against Napoli. However, he made no further appearances for the club. After leaving the club, he expressed his confusion over not playing more for Palermo, commenting "The manager would say ‘you’re not far off, keep doing what you’re doing and you’ll be playing.’ Well, after one month then two, three and four you start to get worried."

Leeds United
On 23 January 2015, less than six months into his Palermo contract, Bamba was loaned to Championship side Leeds United for the remainder of the season, with the possibility of making the transfer permanent at a later date. He made his debut for Leeds in a 2–1 West Yorkshire derby win over Huddersfield Town a week later. Less than a month after joining the side, Bamba was named captain for three games in place of Liam Cooper. In particular, he served as captain when Leeds beat the then league leaders Middlesbrough 1–0, with Bamba receiving praise for his performance.

Bamba scored his first goal for Leeds against Fulham in a 3–0 away victory in March. After impressing during his time at Leeds, Bamba revealed his desire to join the club on a permanent basis. However, he was also outspoken towards the club's owner Massimo Cellino advising "the person in charge has to do better for the sake of the club and the supporters". In June, Leeds arranged with Bamba's club Palermo to sign him on a permanent basis for an undisclosed fee. The deal was for two years with the option for a third year. New Leeds United head coach Uwe Rösler described Bamba as "a match-winner in both boxes", and said that "he brings fantastic qualities with him" and "he can be a leader by himself for the young team he is working with".

In the offseason, Bamba was appointed captain of Leeds by head coach Uwe Rösler, taking over from previous captain Liam Cooper. Bamba received the man of the match award in a 1–1 draw against Burnley in the league on the opening day of the season. Bamba scored a "stunning" long range volley against Wolverhampton Wanderers in a 2–1 win late in the season. At the end of the 2015–16 season, Bamba was again critical of Leeds owner Cellino, calling on him to put 'promises to action'. He revealed the players were unaware if head coach Steve Evans would be retained for the following 2016–17 season, that the players were unaware of when to return for pre season training and they were told they would find out 'by text' when Cellino had made a decision.

Nonetheless, new head coach Garry Monk announced Bamba would remain as Leeds captain for the 2016–17 season. On 7 August, Bamba scored an own goal against Queens Park Rangers in a 3–0 defeat in the opening match of the season and was subsequently dropped from the side, falling behind Kyle Bartley, Liam Cooper and Pontus Jansson in the pecking order. On 1 September 2016, Bamba, despite being Leeds' captain, was released by the club. His contract was cancelled by mutual consent following the close of the transfer window the previous day. The decision was made after Monk informed him that he would no longer be first choice at the club.

Cardiff City

Following his release, Bamba trained with Derby County who were managed by his former Leicester boss Nigel Pearson but was not offered a deal. He instead joined Neil Warnock at Cardiff City in October 2016, signing a two-year contract. Warnock had long been keen on signing Bamba at previous clubs and had contacted him a month before the move, when both were without a club, and urged him to wait for Warnock's appointment at a new club to join him there. He made his debut for the club in a Severnside derby match against Bristol City on 14 October, scoring the winning goal as the Bluebirds won 2–1. His performances for Cardiff led manager Warnock to declare that "I wouldn't want anyone else. I don't think there's anyone better." Bamba received his first red card in seven years against Ipswich Town in December, following a scuffle with forward, David McGoldrick. After receiving the red card, Bamba clashed with the fourth official before being physically restrained by Warnock and leaving the pitch. His reaction led to a three match ban. In April, Bamba suffered a groin injury against Barnsley, which ended his season prematurely.

Bamba returned to the squad at the beginning of the 2017–18 season, helping Cardiff win their three opening games of the season, for the first time in their history. He signed a new three-year contract on 25 August 2017, following it up by heading in the winner against Queens Park Rangers the next day. He went on to help the club win promotion to the Premier League after finishing the season in second place. He was ever present in the league, appearing in all 46 league matches, and was named in the PFA Championship Team of the Year.

He made his debut in the Premier League in Cardiff's first match of the 2018–19 season, a 2–0 defeat to AFC Bournemouth, before scoring his first goal in the top division in a 4–1 defeat to Chelsea in September 2018. Bamba scored a further 3 goals during the season, including in wins against Brighton & Hove Albion and Southampton. Having missed only one match during the course of the season, he was ruled out for the remainder of the campaign after rupturing his cruciate knee ligaments in a defeat against Wolverhampton Wanderers on 5 March 2019.

In July 2019 it was revealed that Bamba would miss the start of the 2019–20 season due to injury.

Middlesbrough
Bamba was re-united with former manager Neil Warnock after joining Middlesbrough on a one-year contract on 10 August 2021. He made his first start for the club 1 day later in a 3-0 defeat away to Blackpool in the Carabao Cup. His first league start came in a 2-0 defeat away to Coventry City on 11 September 2021. Bamba won the Sky Bet Man of the Match award for his performance in a 2-0 victory against his former club Cardiff City on 23 October 2021. 

On 4 February 2022, Bamba was subbed on in the 28th minute of extra time in Middlesbrough's FA Cup tie against Manchester United. Upon the game going to penalties, he took and converted Middlesbrough's 5th spot kick and ultimately allowed the Boro to progress to the fifth round of the tournament for the first time since 2015. Bamba was released by the club at the end of the 2021–22 season.

International career
Although born in France, Bamba represents his parents' nation of Ivory Coast. He featured in the 2003 FIFA World Youth Championship, the 2005 African Youth Championship and the 2008 Toulon Tournament. Bamba was part of the Ivory Coast squad that reached the quarter-finals of the 2008 Olympic Games.

Bamba won his first cap at full international level for Ivory Coast in a 2008 friendly match against Israel, and his second cap as a late substitute in a friendly against Turkey. Bamba made his competitive debut in a 5–0 win against Malawi in a 2010 FIFA World Cup qualifying match, again as a late substitute. This match was played in the aftermath of the Houphouët-Boigny Arena stampede, which killed dozens of Ivorian spectators. Bamba became a regular in the national team as they qualified for the 2010 Africa Cup of Nations and the 2010 FIFA World Cup. Bamba scored his first goal for the team in a friendly against Rwanda, as part of the squad's preparation for the 2010 African Cup. He played in all of Ivory Coast's matches at the 2010 Africa Cup of Nations, but the team suffered a quarter-final defeat to Algeria after extra time. The "uneasy" central defensive partnership between Kolo Touré and Bamba was cited as one of the reasons for their defeat. The tournament had been played in the shadow of the shooting of the Togo team bus, however, with death threats also being made against the Ivory Coast team.

Manager Vahid Halilhodžić, who had worked with Bamba at PSG and given him his first appearances at club and international level, was sacked after the tournament. The new Ivorian coach, Sven-Göran Eriksson, selected Bamba in his provisional 30-man squad for the 2010 World Cup on 11 May. Bamba scored in Eriksson's first match in charge, a 2–2 draw with Paraguay. Bamba was selected in the Ivory Coast's 23-man World Cup squad, but was dropped from the starting lineup, with midfielder Didier Zokora chosen to partner with Kolo Touré in central defence.

Bamba resumed his partnership with Touré in the 2012 Africa Cup of Nations. Ivory Coast did not concede a goal during the entire tournament, but lost the final against Zambia on a penalty shootout. At the 2014 FIFA World Cup, Bamba played in central defence alongside Zokora after Toure contracted malaria in the period before the tournament. Bamba was booked in the first match, which Ivory Coast won 2–1 against Japan. Ivory Coast were eliminated at the group stage after suffering 2–1 defeats against both Colombia and Greece.

Bamba was called up to the squad for 10 September 2014 fixture against Cameroon, however on 29 December 2014 he was a surprising omission from the Ivory Coast squad for the 2015 Africa Cup of Nations. Although he has not retired from international football, he has not appeared for the side since 2014.

Style of play

Chiefly a centre-back, Bamba played as a defensive midfielder during his emergence at Paris SG, before becoming a centre-back at age 15. He has sporadically played in the midfield since then, most successfully for Mixu Paatelainen at Hibs.

Jim Leishman, who signed Bamba at Dunfermline Athletic, said of his former charge in 2010: "He's certainly got the physique and he's got the potential to do it. But potential sometimes passes you by, it's all about going out and doing it. He's a great runner, he's as strong as an ox, and he's a strong tackler." Sky Sports Soriebah Kajue in September 2011 said Bamba "established himself as a rock at the heart of the Foxes defence and has produced a level of consistency this year that has simply been outstanding", paying tribute to "Bamba's burgeoning reputation as a ball-playing defender".

Sven-Göran Eriksson, who managed Bamba at club level for Leicester City and internationally for the Ivory Coast, compared the defender with Franz Beckenbauer. Cardiff manager Neil Warnock regularly told Bamba "Don’t be Beckenbauer. Just kick or head it. When it’s on, pass it, but if it’s not on, just put it up there," and in December 2017 Warnock branded Bamba and fellow Cardiff centre-half Sean Morrison as better than Virgil van Dijk. Bamba's favourite players growing up were Lilian Thuram and George Weah.

Personal life
Bamba met his English wife Chloe while playing for Leicester. They have three children together. He also has a son called Jaxxson Shields from a previous relationship with a Scottish woman. Bamba is multilingual, being able to speak English, French, Italian, Turkish and "the Ivorian dialect that his father used at home". In 2021, he was diagnosed with Non-Hodgkin lymphoma and began undergoing chemotherapy treatment. Four months later in May 2021, he announced that he was cancer-free.

Career statistics

Club

International

HonoursDunfermline Athletic 
Scottish Cup runner-up: 2006–07Cardiff CityEFL Championship runner-up: 2017–18Ivory CoastAfrica Cup of Nations runner-up: 2012Individual'
PFA Team of the Year: 2017–18 Championship
Leeds United Player of the Month: August 2015

References

External links

 
 
 

1985 births
Living people
Footballers from Val-de-Marne
French footballers
Citizens of Ivory Coast through descent
Ivorian footballers
Ivory Coast under-20 international footballers
Ivory Coast international footballers
Association football defenders
Association football midfielders
Paris Saint-Germain F.C. players
Dunfermline Athletic F.C. players
Hibernian F.C. players
Leicester City F.C. players
Trabzonspor footballers
Palermo F.C. players
Leeds United F.C. players
Cardiff City F.C. players
Middlesbrough F.C. players
Ligue 1 players
English Football League players
Scottish Premier League players
Scottish Football League players
Süper Lig players
Serie A players
Premier League players
2010 Africa Cup of Nations players
2010 FIFA World Cup players
2012 Africa Cup of Nations players
2013 Africa Cup of Nations players
2014 FIFA World Cup players
Olympic footballers of Ivory Coast
Footballers at the 2008 Summer Olympics
French expatriate footballers
Ivorian expatriate footballers
Expatriate footballers in England
Expatriate footballers in Italy
Expatriate footballers in Scotland
Expatriate footballers in Turkey
Expatriate footballers in Wales
French expatriate sportspeople in England
French expatriate sportspeople in Italy
French expatriate sportspeople in Scotland
French expatriate sportspeople in Turkey
French expatriate sportspeople in Wales
Ivorian expatriate sportspeople in England
Ivorian expatriate sportspeople in Italy
Ivorian expatriate sportspeople in Scotland
Ivorian expatriate sportspeople in Turkey
Ivorian expatriate sportspeople in Wales
French sportspeople of Ivorian descent
People from Ivry-sur-Seine
Middlesbrough F.C. non-playing staff
Association football coaches